Institute of Medicine (IOM) is the premiere medical institution of Nepal located in Kathmandu

History

The Institute of Medicine (IOM), established in 1972 at Tribhuvan University, was entrusted with the responsibility of training health care workers at all levels for the health care needs of Nepal. Within the first decade of its establishment, the IOM developed 12 campuses scattered over the country: three campuses in Kathmandu and nine outside the Kathmandu Valley.

Initially, the emphasis of IOM was on the training of middle-level health workers. Programmes serving this purpose include ANM, CMA, Proficiency Certificate Course in General Medicine, Pharmacy, Radiology, Physiotherapy, Nursing, Health Laboratory and Traditional Medicine.

The institutional goals of IOM have continued to change. The mission of the IOM expanded into training tertiary-level health professionals. By 1977 it had at the graduate level two-year Bachelor programmes in Community Nursing, Paediatric Nursing and Adult Nursing.

In 1978, a community-oriented integrated MBBS programme was started with intake of 22 students. Subsequently, the class size was increased to 60, and in 2013 it was further increased to 76. subsequently Post graduation courses and Doctorate of Medicine (DM) courses have been offered by this institution. 

In a groundbreaking moment for the institute, Professor Prakash Sayami was appointed as the new dean of the Institute, prompted by a second fast-unto-death by Professor Govinda K.C. This brought a change to the system of appointment of the officials on the basis of political affiliations and promulgated the system of seniority in the Institute.

Mounting pressure from the Tribhuvan University officials on political appointments and provision of affiliations to resource-poor hospitals led to the resignation of Professor Prakash Saymi. He was succeeded by political appointee Prof. Sashi Sharma. Sharma is alleged to be involved in embezzlement of large amounts of money during his term as the vice-president of Nepal Medical Council and was subjected to investigations by the Commission for the Investigation of Abuse of Authority (CIAA). In reaction, Professor Govinda KC, the philanthropist orthopedic surgeon, announced a fast unto death in January 2014. IOM offers 45 scholarship seats in MBBS every year.

Hospital 

Tribhuvan University Teaching Hospital, a 300-bed facility, was completed in 1984 with support from JICA. Another 100 beds were added in 1993. Currently at 663 beds, Tribhuvan University Hospital is the largest hospital in country, providing new tertiary-level health service. This hospital is the site of teaching and research activities of IOM.

B. P. Koirala Lions Center for Ophthalmic Studies 

B. P. Koirala Lions Center for Ophthalmic Studies (BPKLCOS), a collaborative project of Tribhuvan University Institute of Medicine, B.P. Eye Foundation and Lions Club International District 325, is an important landmark in the history of blindness prevention in Nepal. Established with funds partially provided by Lions Club International Sight First Program and co-financed by Lions Club International Multiple District 102 Switzerland and Liechtenstein, this center has provided its services to about 82,000 eye patients in the last two years of its establishment. The center provides services at its premises and at satellite clinics and eye camps in the far-flung areas of the country.

BPKLCOS is where MD Ophthalmology resident doctors and B. Optometry students have their clinical rotations and other academic activities.

New buildings 

Four other centers have started functioning since early 2009:

Ganesh Man Singh Center for Ear, Nose, Throat, Head and Neck Surgery: The out-patient department is functioning fully. In-patient and operative procedures are carried out in the old building of the main Teaching Hospital Complex.
Manamohan Cardiovascular and Transplant Center is fully functioning with its own sets of faculty and medical officers.
Gynaecology and Obstetrics Centre: under-construction.
Paediatric Center is fully functioning.

The New Emergency Building was recently inaugurated by honorable president of Nepal, Dr. Ram Baran Yadav. It was built by the owner of Bhatbhateni Super market in the memory of his parents. It is fully functional and equipped with labs and imaging facilities for dealing with critical situations round the clock. Patients are triaged into red, yellow and green zones. Those who need minimal observation are placed in the observation ward. A new rule was enforced by incoming director of the hospital in restricting referrals to other hospitals as long as beds are available in the hospital.

Central University Nursing Schools and Hospitals 
Ayurveda Campus, Kirtipur
Maharajgunj Medical Campus, Maharajgunj (also known as The Central Campus, IOM)
Maharajgunj Nursing Campus, Maharajgunj
Nepalgunj Nursing Campus, Nepalgunj.
Pokhara Nursing Campus, Pokhara
Biratnagar Nursing Campus, Biratnagar
Birgunj Nursing Campus, Birgunj

Major affiliated hospitals, nursing and medical colleges 

Chitwan medical College, Bharatpur
Gandaki Medical College, Pokhara
Janaki medical college, Janakpur
KIST Medical College & Teaching Hospital, Lalitpur
National Medical College, Birgunj
Nepalese Army Institute of Health Sciences (NAIHS), Kathmandu
Nepal Ayurved Medical College & Teaching Hospital, Birgunj
Peoples' Dental College, Nayabazar, Kathmandu
Lalitpur Nursing Campus, Lalitpur
Universal College of Medical Sciences, Bhairhawa

With support from the University of Calgary, Canada, a three-year Postgraduate Generalist (family physician) training and one-year Postgraduate Diploma in Anaesthesiology were started in 1982 and 1984, respectively.

Today the IOM has 29 programs, from proficiency certificate level to the highest postgraduate degree in medicine, public health, paramedical, nursing and traditional Ayurveda medicine through Tribhuvan University Hospital and nine campuses around the country.

Optometry 

There are no independent optometry colleges in Nepal. In 1997, Bachelor of Optometry was introduced in IOM initially as a three-year course. In 2003, the course was revised to a four-year course to meet international standards.

National Health Profession Council (NHPC) with the recommendations of Nepalese Association of Optometrists (NAO) is the regulating body of optometrists in Nepal as there is no separate optometry council. However, like in other countries, recognition of optometrists (recently recognized as 'Doctors of Optometry' by the NAO as in US, Australia, Philippines etc.), is increasing and their vital role in eye care is being realized.

Optometry in IOM is under Department of Ophthalmology. It is a unique place in the world where optometrists are trained with the MD Ophthalmology residents by the ophthalmology and optometry faculties.

Faculty of Nursing 

In 1972, with the introduction of the New Education System Plan, nursing education became the responsibility of the Institute of Medicine (IoM), Tribhuvan University. The first nursing school became an IoM campus and the second one, an extension campus. These campuses ran a three-year nursing certificate programme that remained very oriented to hospital nursing, though the curriculum continued to prepare nurses for hospital services.

In 1987, following a major review process which extended over several years, a new primary health-care oriented curriculum was introduced. This curriculum intends to meet the health-care needs of the people of Nepal. Therefore, the aim is to produce graduates who have the knowledge, understanding and skills to provide preventive, promotive, curative, rehabilitative aspects of care, to individuals, families and community.

The existing two-track post basic BN program was started in 1968. The decision to start the revised program was based on having one nursing program at the Bachelor level with two tracks/community nursing and hospital nursing. Having two tracks with students taking a common course in areas of teaching, leadership management and research helped to prepare nurses to be flexible and adapt to any area of practice. Since the introduction of the first post-basic program, 404 nurse have graduated.

The recent development in nursing education is a program leading to a master's degree in nursing (MN). The result of a study conducted in 1991 to determine the need for and the feasibility of introducing an MN program, indicated that with the expansion of health services, there would be a need for more nursing positions requiring higher level qualifications. The study results also indicated that with the expansion of health services, there would be a need for more nursing positions requiring higher level qualifications. The study results also indicated that 90 percent of the BN graduates surveyed were interested in undertaking study at the master's degree level in Nepal. The curriculum for the MN program was developed and plans were implemented in April 1995.

The most recent program in Nursing is BSc Nursing which was started in 2005 AD with 20 students. The program was focused in meeting the international standard of four years bachelor's degree and provide the nation with high skilled manpower in the field of nursing.

Faculty of Ayurveda 

Institute of Medicine (IOM) provides Bachelor of Ayurveda, Medicine and Surgery (BAMS) through Ayurveda Campus, Kritipur. Ayurveda Campus, Kritipur admits thirty students (top 15 gets full scholarship) in Bachelor of Ayurveda, Medicine and Surgery (BAMS) every year into its 5½-year course with three professionals of 18 months each, followed by an internship of one year.

Ayurveda Campus is the only centre for Ayurvedic education in Nepal. It resulted from the merging of HMG's Ayurveda Vidhyalaya and Chikitsalaya with the Institute of Medicine in 1972. History reveals that Rajakiya Ayurveda Vidhyalaya was the first to start technical education in the country in 1993. Though striving for infrastructure since more than two decades, Bachelor and Certificate admissions were interrupted in 1991 and 1993 and was restarted in 1996.

Departments and support centres

National Centre for Health Professions Education (former Medical Education Department)
 Training of teachers on medical education: IOM teachers as well as teachers from other medical colleges
 Training of trainers to help different program of Ministry of Health and population
 Assisted in the development of national policy on education of health professionals education

Health Learning Materials Center
Played a pioneering role in the development of learning materials to assist the primary health care movement of the government as well in training the writers, editors and illustrators for the development of learning materials in the country.

Mental Health Project
Provide community-based mental health care. It is working at levels including developing needed human resources and raising the awareness in the community. It is working to uplift the mental health status for positive psychological and social development of children.

Postgraduate education and research support center
Central Library
Tribhuvan University, Teaching Hospital (TUTH) Library under institute of Medicine, started since 1978, previously known as Central Campus Library, IOM which was established from 1972. This Library is also the deposited center of WHO publications.

Department of Information Technology
Development of a sustainable Internet Service Provider inside the premises of Institute of Medicine. It has played a key role in enhancing the access to internet to the faculty and students.

Department of Community Medicine and Public Health

  
Public health refers to "the science and art of preventing disease, prolonging life and promoting health through organized efforts and informed choices of society, organizations, public and private, communities and individuals." It is concerned with threats to health based on population health analysis. The population in question can be as small as a handful of people, or as large as all the inhabitants of several continents (for instance, in the case of a pandemic). The dimensions of health can encompass "a state of complete physical, mental and social well-being and not merely the absence of disease or infirmity", as defined by the United Nations' World Health Organization. Public health incorporates the interdisciplinary approaches of epidemiology, biostatistics and health services. Environmental health, community health, behavioral health, health economics, research methodology, project planning and development, food and nutrition, public policy, insurance medicine and occupational safety and health are other important subfields.

Institute of medicine, runs public health programme since 1987 A.D. Public health program from IOM is recognized worldwide and is considered to be one of the best in South Asia. IOM has played a major role for the production of skilled and competent public health professionals.  Currently, Bachelor of Public Health (BPH) and Master of Public Health (MPH) are the public health programs run by the Institute. The BPH and MPH programs have 40 seats each.  The course duration is four years for BPH and two years for MPH. BPH program is an integrated course which comprises both theory and practicum. MPH programs are run on the specialized subjects as follows:

1) MPH

2) MPH in Nutrition (MPHN)

3) MPH in Health Promotion and Health Education (MHPE)

Challenges 
Medical education in Nepal is highly competitive as there are limited seats in medical schools. The tuition fees in private schools is very high and often unaffordable to vast majority of families. Only the best of the best students can rank high enough for full scholarships in government medical school. Recently government has opened a few more medical schools. For many years, Institue of Medicine was the only government medical school in the country 

Dr. Govinda KC is a staunch supporter of medical education reform in Nepal and has long advocated to break the education "mafia" present in the private 
 medical education system.

See also
The other technical institutes at TU are:
 Institute of Agriculture and Animal Science
 Institute of Forestry
 Institute of Engineering
 Institute of Science and Technology

References

Medical colleges in Nepal
Tribhuvan University
1972 establishments in Nepal